Chris Sheasby (born 30 November 1966 in Windsor, Berkshire) is an English former international rugby union player, commentator and coach.

Biography

Sheasby was educated at Radley College, King's College London where he graduated in Mathematics in 1989, and at the University of Cambridge.

Club career
He played No.8 in a rugby career with London Wasps, Harlequins and London Irish. He started in the 2002 Powergen Cup Final at Twickenham, as London Irish defeated the Northampton Saints.

International career
During the course of his career he secured seven caps for England and scored a try on his debut against Italy. He also had a place in the England rugby union Sevens squad that won the Sevens World Cup in 1993.

Post-retirement
Sheasby has also coached Staines R.F.C., Bracknell R.F.C., most recently acting as player/coach for Marlow Rugby Club. He also featured as head coach of the UCS XV where he left after a single game.

Personal life
Sheasby was married to former British pole vaulter Kate Staples, also known as Zodiac from the television show Gladiators. Sheasby is stepfather to Staples' daughter Ella with fellow Gladiator Trojan, Mark Griffin; and the couple have two other children, two boys Kai and Luca. The family live in Esher, Surrey.

References

External links
Wasps profile

1966 births
Living people
Alumni of Hughes Hall, Cambridge
Alumni of King's College London
England international rugby sevens players
England international rugby union players
English rugby union coaches
English rugby union players
People educated at Radley College
Rugby union players from Windsor, Berkshire
London Irish players
Wasps RFC players
Harlequin F.C. players